The women's 20 kilometres walk at the 2003 All-Africa Games were held on October 14. This was the first women's road race walking event at the All-Africa Games replacing earlier shorter track distances.

Results

References
Results
Results

20